Jakub Vojta (born February 8, 1987) is a Czech former professional ice hockey defenceman. He played in the Slovak Extraliga and the Czech Extraliga. Vojta was selected by the Carolina Hurricanes in the 4th round (94th overall) of the 2005 NHL Entry Draft.

Vojta made his Slovak Extraliga debut playing with HK Nitra during the 2007–08 Slovak Extraliga season.

In the year 2007 Jakub Vojta played in the IIHF World U20 Championship for the Czech Rep. U-20 Team. The team made it to the quarter-final where they met Sweden and lost 1–5 against Sweden. However, due to a knee injury from the 2011/2012 season that has healed, Vojta was not under contract in that season.

Career statistics

Regular season and playoffs

International

References

External links

1987 births
Living people
Carolina Hurricanes draft picks
Czech ice hockey defencemen
HC Sparta Praha players
HK Nitra players
Ottawa 67's players
Sportspeople from Ústí nad Labem
Czech expatriate ice hockey players in Canada
Czech expatriate ice hockey players in Slovakia
Slovak expatriate ice hockey players in Germany